Bullia pura, common name the pure plough shell, is a species of sea snail, a marine gastropod mollusk in the family Nassariidae, the Nassa mud snails or dog whelks.

Description

Distribution

References

Nassariidae
Gastropods described in 1885